The South Carolina militia units in the American Revolution  were established on January 17, 1775 by the South Carolina Provincial Congress.  These militia units were subordinate to the South Carolina Council of Safety.  Officers were selected by February 1775.  In November 1775, the Militia units were renamed regiments.  On March 28, 1778, the South Carolina General Assembly consolidated the regiments into four brigades, each led by a Brigadier General.

Militia units
The first sixteen militia were established in February 1775. While initially called just militia, they were renamed as regiments in November 1775.  When Charlestown fell on May 12, 1780, most of the generals were taken as prisoners by the British and the regiments were left to fend for themselves.  Most new regiments were Light Dragoons vice infantry.  
The known regiments, brigades, and independent units included:

Notes:

Provincial and state units
For clarification and comparison purposes, the South Carolina provincial and state troop units are listed below:

See also
 South Carolina in the American Revolution
 Southern Campaigns: Pension Transactions for a description of the transcription effort by Will Graves
 Southern theater of the American Revolutionary War
 South Carolina Line: 1st, 2nd, 3rd, 4th, 5th, 6th Regiments
 List of North Carolina militia units in the American Revolution
 List of United States militia units in the American Revolutionary War

References

Bibliography
 
 
 
 
 

 
 

Militia units
United States militia in the American Revolution
American Revolution
American Revolution-related lists
 List of South Carolina militia units in the American Revolution